Zorianos is a mountain village in the municipal unit of Vardousia, northwestern Phocis, Greece. It is situated on a forested mountainside near the border with Aetolia-Acarnania, 31 km west of Amfissa. In 2011, the population of the village was 153.

Population

External links
 Zorianos GTP Travel Pages

See also
List of settlements in Phocis

References

Populated places in Phocis